House with Lilies was a Russian-Ukrainian melodramatic TV series directed by Vladimir Krasnopolsky and Valery Uskov. The authors describe their series as a  family saga. The premiere took place in Ukraine on TV channel Inter March 31, 2014. In Russia the premiere was held on Channel One.

Plot 
After the end of World War II, war hero Mikhail Govorovov becomes a Regional Party Leader in the Communist Party and moves with his whole family to a country house. At first, Michail does not believe the legends of a curse on the house: neither its owners nor their children and grandchildren will be happy in love.

Cast
 Sergey Makhovikov as Mikhail Ivanovich Govorov
Darya Moroz as Taisiya, Lilya's mother 
 Olesya Sudzilovskaya  as Margarita, Govorov's wife 
 Nikolai Dobrynin as Dementy Kharitonovich Shulgin 
 Anna Gorshkova as  Govorov's daughter 
 Denis Matrosov as Rodion Kamyshev, Lilya's husband 
 Alexey Fateev as Sergey Morozov
 Yevgeny Knyazev as actor Arefiev
 Elena Radevich as Lilya in 16–18 years
 Mikhail Zhigalov as  Egorych  
 Viktor Rakov as Miron Polischuk, MGB officer
 Boris Khimichev as   Rostopchin
 Sergey Batalov as Gavrila Petrovich
 Oksana Shvets as Director of Orphanage

Awards and nominations 
 TeleTriumph (2015)
 Best Writer (Writer's crew) of the TV movie/series: Maria Bek, Elena Boiko — won
 APKIT Awards (2015)
 Best Television Mini-Series (5–24 episodes) — nom

References

External links
 Страница сериала на сайте Первого канала
  

Russian television miniseries
Ukrainian television series
2010s Ukrainian television series
2010s Russian television series
2014 Russian television series debuts
2014 Russian television series endings
2014 Ukrainian television series debuts
2014 Ukrainian television series endings
Russian telenovelas
Channel One Russia original programming
Russian-language television shows